A letterform, letter-form or letter form, is a term used especially in typography, palaeography, calligraphy and epigraphy to mean a letter's shape.  A letterform is a type of glyph, which is a specific, concrete way of writing an abstract character or grapheme.

For example, medieval scholars may discuss the particular handwritten letterforms that distinguish one script from another.

The history of letterforms is discussed in fields of study relating to materials used in writing. Epigraphy includes the study of letterforms carved in stone or other permanent materials. Palaeography is the study of writing in ancient and medieval manuscripts. Calligraphy treats the letterforms of decorative writing, usually in ink. In the field of typography, type design is the process of designing typefaces that consist of sets of letterforms for use with metal print or computer. More broadly letterforms may be discussed wherever letters appear stylistically—in graffiti for example.

In context

 Letterforms in alphabets: Arabic alphabet, Cyrillic script
 Letterforms in calligraphy: Man'yōgana, Hentaigana
 Letterforms in history: Long s, R rotunda
 Letterforms in technology: Typeface, Computer printer

See also

References

External links
 Letterforms in design: Is Gotham the New Interstate at The Morning News
 Named parts of a letter: Type Anatomy 1.0

Typography
Graphemes